Wilcoe is a former coal town located in McDowell County, West Virginia, United States. Wilcoe was once an independent community and was incorporated into Gary in 1971. Wilcoe has its own post office with ZIP code 24895.

References

Populated places in McDowell County, West Virginia
Coal towns in West Virginia
Neighborhoods in West Virginia